Wu Zhipu (1906–1967) was the first CPC governor of Henan and CPC Committee Secretary of Henan. He was born in Henan.

Wu pressured his subordinates to harvest grain well in excess of official quotas during the Great Leap Forward, claiming 450 million jin was produced in 1958 when in reality villagers only harvested 281 million jin.

References

1906 births
1967 deaths
People's Republic of China politicians from Henan
Presidents of Henan University
CPPCC Chairmen of Henan
CCP committee secretaries of Henan